Liam Langridge-Barker (born 1999) is a British professional basketball player who currently plays for the Plymouth City Patriots in the British Basketball League.

College career 
Langridge-Barker played for the Three Rivers Academy in the Academy Basketball League. In 2017, the school announced a partnership with the Surrey Scorchers to become the club's new youth academy. As a result, Scorchers head coach Creon Raftopoulos also joined the team as assistant coach.  Liam graduated from Three Rivers Academy in 2019, choosing to study for a Business degree at Plymouth Marjon University.

Professional career 
In 2018, Raftopoulos signed Langridge-Barker for the Surrey Scorchers in the British Basketball League. Following the end of the 2018–19 season, Liam and the Scorchers parted ways.

Liam has signed with Plymouth Raiders for the 2019–20 (whilst also attending Plymouth Marjon University).

References 

1999 births
Living people
British men's basketball players
Surrey Scorchers players
British Basketball League players
Plymouth City Patriots players
Guards (basketball)